Onni Rafael Rajasaari (2 March 1910 in Hanko – 12 November 1994 in Hanko) was a Finnish athlete specializing in long jump and triple jump. He took part in the 1932 Summer Olympics and in the 1936 Summer Olympics, but is best known for becoming European champion in triple jump 1938 in Paris. In the summer of 1939, Rajasaari set a new European record in triple jump, as he jumped 15.52 meters at a competition in Lahti.

National titles
Finnish Athletics Championships
Triple jump: 1933, 1934, 1935, 1936, 1937, 1938, 1939
Long jump: 1938

International competitions

Personal bests

Last updated 29 July 2015.

References

External links 
 
 
 
 

1910 births
1994 deaths
Finnish male long jumpers
Finnish male triple jumpers
Olympic athletes of Finland
Athletes (track and field) at the 1932 Summer Olympics
Athletes (track and field) at the 1936 Summer Olympics
European Athletics Championships medalists
People from Hanko
Sportspeople from Uusimaa